Edward Davis MIBS (1813 – 14 August 1878) was a 19th century British sculptor.

Life

He was born in London but his parents were from Carmarthen in south Wales.

He attended the Royal Academy Schools in London and trained in the studio of Edward Hodges Baily, and was possibly in the studio while he worked on the statue of Nelson for Nelson's Column. He exhibited at the Royal Academy from 1834 until 1877. He lived and worked in the Fitzroy Square area of London.

He died on 14 August 1878.

Works
Bust of Charles Kemble (1836) exhibited at RA
Bust of William Tooke (1837) exhibited at Liverpool Academy of Arts
Bust of David Salomons (1838) exhibited at RA
Bust of F Raincock (1838) exhibited at Liverpool Academy of Arts
Bust of Benjamin Aislabie (1838) at Marylebone Cricket Club
Carvings on the front of the Old Adelphi Theatre, London (1840)
Bust of the Duchess of Kent (1843) in the Royal Collection
Statuary group "The Power of the Law" (1844) originally at Westminster Hall, moved to Assize Court in Cambridge
Bust of Sir John Jervis (1849) Middle Temple London
Bust of the Duke of Rutland (1850) in Belvoir Castle
Statue of the Duke of Rutland for Leicester (1850)
"Venus and Cupid" statuary displayed at the Great Exhibition 1851 moved to Salford Art Gallery
Statue of Sir William Nott for Carmarthen (1851)
"The Virgin and the Saviour" (1855)
Bust of William Rathbone Lord Mayor of Liverpool (1857) in St George's Hall, Liverpool
Bust of George James Guthrie (1857) in Royal College of Surgeons
Statue of Josiah Wedgewood for Stoke-on-Trent (1860)
"Rebecca at the Well" at International Exhibition 1862
Bust of Dr Edmund Alexander Parkes (1862) at University College, London
Bust of Thomas Hood (1867) at Royal Society of London
Bust of Daniel Maclise (1870) at Burlington House
Bust of John Constable (1874) at Burlington House
"Cupid and Physche" (1875)
Bust of Connop Thirlwall, Bishop of St David's (1876) Westminster Abbey
Bust of Sir Francis Ronalds (dnk) at Royal Society of London

Gallery

References

Externallinks

 

1813 births
1878 deaths
19th-century British sculptors
19th-century English male artists
Alumni of the Royal Academy Schools
English male sculptors
Sculptors from London